1st Intelligence, Surveillance and Reconnaissance Brigade (1 ISR Bde) of the British Army was created as part of the Army 2020 reform, to command military intelligence, ISTAR, and electronic warfare units.

Brigade 
Under the Army 2020 programme, a larger emphasis was placed on cyber and specialist capabilities.  As part of this reorganisation, the 1st Military Intelligence Brigade and Royal Artillery UAV Regiments were merged with the addition of the Honourable Artillery Company and  the two reserve Special Air Service Regiments (SAS) into the 1st Intelligence Surveillance and Reconnaissance Brigade.  The new brigade was stood up on 1 September 2014 at Upavon and placed under Force Troops Command.

Group 
Under the Future Soldier programme announced on 25 November 2021, the brigade will be reduced to a Colonel's Command, be renamed Intelligence, Surveillance, and Reconnaissance Group and transfer from 6th Division to 'Field Army Troops'.  The role of the group is to be to command the Army's miniature UAS, tactical UAS, counter-intelligence, and reach back intelligence capabilities, the Specialist Group Military Intelligence, and Land Intelligence Fusion Centre.  It will also command the Land Image Intelligence Company, a pool of experts who deliver image analysis for all the Army's image collection platforms.

Structure
Headquarters, 1st Intelligence, Surveillance, and Reconnaissance Brigade, at Trenchard Lines, Upavon
 14 Signal Regiment (Electronic Warfare), Royal Corps of Signals, at Cawdor Barracks, Brawdy
 2nd Military Intelligence (Exploitation) Battalion, Intelligence Corps, at Trenchard Lines, Upavon
 3rd Military Intelligence Battalion, Intelligence Corps , in Hackney
 4th Military Intelligence Battalion, Intelligence Corps, at Ward Barracks, Bulford Camp
 6th Military Intelligence Battalion, Intelligence Corps , in Manchester – paired with 2 Military Intelligence Battalion
 7th Military Intelligence Battalion, Intelligence Corps , in Bristol – paired with 4 Military Intelligence Battalion
 32 Regiment Royal Artillery, at Roberts Barracks, Larkhill Garrison (UAV operations, with Lockheed Martin Desert Hawk III)
 Specialist Group Military Intelligence, at Denison Barracks, Hermitage
 Defence Intelligence Fusion Centre, at Denison Barracks, Hermitage
 Defence Cultural and Linguistic Support Unit, at Denison Barracks, Hermitage

On Formation in 2014

Headquarters 1st Intelligence and Surveillance Brigade, at Trenchard Lines, Upavon

 14 Signal Regiment (Electronic Warfare), Royal Corps of Signals, at Cawdor Barracks, Brawdy
 1 Military Intelligence Battalion, Intelligence Corps, at Bourlon Barracks, Catterick Garrison
 2 Military Intelligence Battalion, Intelligence Corps, at Trenchard Lines, Upavon
 3 Military Intelligence Battalion, Intelligence Corps), in Hackney, London – paired with 1 MI Bn
 4 Military Intelligence Battalion, Intelligence Corps, at Ward Barracks, Bulford Camp
 5 Military Intelligence Battalion, Intelligence Corps, in Edinburgh – paired with 1 MI Bn
 6 Military Intelligence Battalion, Intelligence Corps, in Manchester – paired with 2 MI Bn
 7 Military Intelligence Battalion, Intelligence Corps, in Bristol – paired with 4 MI Bn
 5th Regiment, Royal Artillery, at Marne Barracks, Catterick Garrison 
 32 Regiment, Royal Artillery, at Roberts Barracks, Larkhill Garrison (Mini UAS)
 47 Regiment, Royal Artillery, at Horne Barracks, Larkhill Garrison (Tactical UAVs)	
 104 Regiment, Royal Artillery, in Newport (Mini UAS) – paired with 32 & 47 Regiments RA
 The Honourable Artillery Company, at Finsbury Barracks, Finsbury, London 
 21(Artists)(Reserve) SAS Regiment, at Albany Barracks, Regents Park, London
 23(Reserve) SAS Regiment, at Kingstanding, Birmingham
 Specialist Group Military Intelligence, at Denison Barracks, Hermitage
 Defence Cultural Specialist Unit, at Denison Barracks, Hermitage
 Land Intelligence Fusion Centre, at Denison Barracks, Hermitage

References

External links
 1st Intelligence, Surveillance and Reconnaissance Brigade Website 



Brigades of the British Army
Military intelligence units and formations of the United Kingdom
Military intelligence brigades
Army 2020
Military units and formations established in 2014
Organisations based in Wiltshire
Army reconnaissance units and formations